Mariebjerg Cemetery (Danish: Mariebjerg Kirkegård) is located in Gentofte north of Copenhagen, Denmark. It was laid out between 1926 and 1933 to the design of the landscape architect Gudmund Nyeland Brandt and is considered an important example of European Modernist landscape architecture. Its design has inspired many other cemeteries both in Denmark and abroad.

Layout
Mariebjerg Cemetery is laid out in a tight, schematic grid pattern over an area of just over 25 hectares. A network of wide avenues cut through the cemetery and long, metre-high hedges subdivide the area.

Each of the resulting spaces contains an interpretation of a characteristic part of the Danish landscape, ranging from dense woods and glades, over ditches, meadows, fields and overgrown slopes to well-nursed garden settings.

Buildings

Vintappergården
Vintappergården dates from c. 1770. It was listed on the Danish registry of protected buildings and places in 1918.

Mariebjerg Crematory and Chapel
Mariebjerg Crematory and Chapel was added in 1936. It was built to the design of Frits Schlegel.

Notable burials

See also

 Parks and open spaces in Copenhagen

References

External links
 

Cemeteries in Copenhagen
Lutheran cemeteries
Danish Culture Canon
1926 establishments in Denmark
Gentofte Municipality
Cemeteries established in the 1920s